Christopher John Baker (born 3 January 1948) is a Thailand-based British writer who has made his home in Bangkok for more than 30 years. He is the co-author of A History of Thailand, Thaksin: The Business of Politics in Thailand, Thailand's Boom and Bust, and Thailand's Crisis, all written with his wife, Dr. Pasuk Phongpaichit. He was the principal writer of the United Nations Development Programme's Thailand Human Development Report 2007: Sufficiency Economy and Human Development, which praised King Bhumibol Adulyadej's self-sufficient economy theory.

In 2010, Chris Baker and his wife Pasuk Phongpaichit published a compilation and translation of the Thai epic poem Khun Chang Khun Phaen. The epic was published in a two volume set, which arranged the story in a narrative form suitable for modern English readers.  Copious footnotes and creative illustrations are also included. They have also published a version of their compilation in Thai.

Baker was the recipient of the 2017 Fukuoka Prize together with his spouse and collaborator, Pasuk Phongpaichit. The prize is awarded annually to those who have made outstanding contributions to academia, arts, and culture in Asia.

Baker is a writer and editor of the Journal of the Siam Society.

Works

References

External links
 The Nation, Sufficiency approach vital in globalised times, 11 January 2007
 Thailand Human Development Report 2007: Sufficiency Economy and Human Development

British emigrants to Thailand
Living people
Political scientists on Thailand
1948 births
Fellows of Queens' College, Cambridge
Thai studies scholars
Alumni of Queens' College, Cambridge
Historians of Thailand
Expatriate academics in Thailand